The Bell Canyon Formation is a geologic formation found in the Delaware Basin of southeastern New Mexico and western Texas. It contains fossils characteristic of the Guadalupian Age of the Permian Period.

Description
The formation consists mostly of marine sandstone and siltstone, but with five interfingering tongues of gray limestone.

Fossils
The formation's Lamar Limestone Member of Guadalupe Mountains National Park has produced fossil holocephalan teeth.

History of investigation
The unit was first designated as a formation by DeFord and Lloyd in 1940, who raised the Delaware Mountain Formation to group rank and designed its previously informal members as formations.

Footnotes

References
 
 
 
 

Permian geology of Texas
Permian formations of New Mexico